Louis Joseph Billera is a Professor of Mathematics at Cornell University.

Career
Billera completed his B.S. at the Rensselaer Polytechnic Institute in 1964. He earned his Ph.D. from the City University of New York in 1968, under the joint supervision of Moses Richardson and Michel Balinski.

Louis Billera served as the first Associate Director of the National Science Foundation Center for Discrete Mathematics and Theoretical Computer Science (DIMACS) at Rutgers University.

In 2010 he gave the invited lecture, "Flag enumeration in polytopes, Eulerian partially ordered sets and Coxeter groups" at the International Congress of Mathematicians in Hyderabad.

Contributions
The common thread through much of his research is to study problems motivated by discrete and convex geometry. A sampling includes constructing polytopes to prove the sufficiency condition for the g-theorem (with Carl Lee), discovering fiber polytopes (with Bernd Sturmfels), and studying the space of phylogenetic trees (with Susan Holmes and Karen Vogtmann).

Awards and honors
In 1994 Billera won the Fulkerson Prize for his paper, Homology of smooth splines. This prize is given every three years to the best paper in discrete mathematics.

In 2012 he became a fellow of the American Mathematical Society.

Selected publications
Louis Billera, "Homology of smooth splines: Generic triangulations and a conjecture of Strang", Transactions of the American Mathematical Society 310 (1988). 325–340.
Louis Billera, Anders Björner, Curtis Greene, Rodica Simion, Richard P. Stanley (eds.): New Perspectives in Algebraic Combinatorics, MSRI Publications, Cambridge University Press 1999, http://library.msri.org/books/Book38/

See also
 Simplicial complex
 Combinatorial commutative algebra
 Quasisymmetric function

References

External links
Billerafest 2008, Conference in Honor of Louis Billera's 65th Birthday. http://www.math.cornell.edu/event/conf/billera65/
 Louis Billera's Homepage
profile at Cornell University

Year of birth missing (living people)
Living people
20th-century American mathematicians
21st-century American mathematicians
Cornell University faculty
Fellows of the American Mathematical Society
Place of birth missing (living people)
City University of New York alumni
Combinatorialists
Rensselaer Polytechnic Institute alumni